Victor Brattström (born 22 March 1997) is a Swedish professional ice hockey player currently playing for the Grand Rapids Griffins in the American Hockey League (AHL) as a prospect with the Detroit Red Wings of the National Hockey League (NHL). He was drafted 160th overall by the Red Wings in the 2018 NHL Entry Draft.

Playing career
During the 2017–18 season, Brattström appeared in 15 games for Timrå IK of the HockeyAllsvenskan, where he posted a 10–5 record, with three shutouts, a 1.93 goals against average (GAA) and .918 save percentage. Timrå IK was promoted to the Swedish Hockey League for the 2018–19 season. 

On 20 April 2018, Brattström signed a one-year contract with Timrå IK. On 22 September 2018, Brattström made his professional debut for Timrå IK, where he allowed three goals on 33 shots in a 2–3 overtime loss to Skellefteå AIK.

As Timrå IK were relegated to the Allsvenskan following a single season in the SHL, Brattström emerged as the club's starting goaltender for the 2019–20 season, appearing in 45 of 52 regular season games. He collected 33 wins, finishing second among league goaltenders with 2.13 goals against average and sixth with a .914 save percentage.

With Timrå IK resigned to continue in the Allsvenskan due to COVID-19, Brattström left to sign a one-year contract with Finnish top flight club, KooKoo of the Liiga on 23 March 2020. On 29 March 2020, Brattström was also signed to a two-year, entry-level contract with draft club, the Detroit Red Wings.

Career statistics

References

External links
 

1997 births
Living people
Detroit Red Wings draft picks
Grand Rapids Griffins players
KooKoo players
Ice hockey people from Gothenburg
Swedish ice hockey goaltenders
Timrå IK players
Toledo Walleye players